Amrish Tyagi (born 14 February 1978) is an Indian political strategist. He is the son of K.C. Tyagi.

He campaigned for Donald Trump, tasked with assessing the demands, expectations and fears of the Asian community in the US, convey this to Trump's team, and to design campaign messages to draw the community in, and create databases for Trump's campaign.

He also managed the social media campaign for Nitish Kumar during the 2015 Bihar assembly elections.

On 5 December 2021, Tyagi joined the Bharatiya Janata Party.

References

1978 births
Living people
Campaign managers
People from Ghaziabad, Uttar Pradesh
Bharatiya Janata Party politicians from Uttar Pradesh